The Mountain Quest Institute (MQI) is a research, retreat and conference center  (both business and academic) on  in Pocahontas County, West Virginia (in Frost, near Marlinton) in the Allegheny Mountains of the United States. MQI claims three "quests":  the Quest for Knowledge, the Quest for Meaning, and the Quest for Consciousness.  MQI promotes itself as scientific, humanistic and spiritual and claims to find no contradiction in this combination.

The Institute's inn,  built at an angle to preserve some ancient trees, is connected to the original 1905 farmhouse by covered porches.  Each room has an individual theme, such as the 'Nautical Room' (which features model ships and a water bed).  The complex includes:  a meeting room, break-out rooms, a computer room, a game room, a sauna and jacuzzi, a tower, and a two-story library.  There are hiking trails and morning visits with the horses (six of which have been born on the farm) and llamas. A labyrinth for walking meditation is a more recent addition.

The Institute's founders are Alex and David Bennet (who has degrees in neuroscience and atomic physics), organizational development and knowledge management professionals  who are also the co-authors of Organizational Survival in the New World: The Intelligent Complex Adaptive System. and Knowledge Mobilization in the Social Sciences and Humanities: Moving from Research to Action.  Topics of recent articles downloadable from the MQI Institute web site include:  Hierarchy as a learning platform, The controversy of consciousness, Learning as associative patterning, CONTEXT: the shared knowledge enigma, Expanding the knowledge paradigm, and The knowledge and knowing of spiritual learning.  More recent areas of research include: The decision-making process for complex situations in a complex environment; Associative patterning: The unconscious life of an organization; Moving from knowledge to wisdom, from ordinary consciousness to extraordinary consicusness; and Engaging tacit knowledge in support of organizational learning.

References

External links
 Mountain Quest Institute website.

Tourist attractions in Pocahontas County, West Virginia